Valay is a rural locality (a settlement) in Cherdynsky District, Perm Krai, Russia. The population was 1,093 as of 2010. There are 7 streets.

Geography 
Valay is located 100 km northeast of Cherdyn (the district's administrative centre) by road. Vizhay is the nearest rural locality.

References 

Rural localities in Cherdynsky District